Yazdan Panah (also Romanized as Yazdān Panāh) is a village in Rigan Rural District, in the Central District of Rigan County, Kerman Province, Iran. At the 2006 census, its population was 479, in 110 families.

References 

Populated places in Rigan County